Alejandra  (English: Alexandra) is a 1956 Argentine film directed by Carlos Schlieper. It is based on a play by Georges Feydeauy and Alexandre Bisson. The film stars Delia Garcés and Georges Rivière and was released on April 19, 1956.

Cast
  Delia Garcés 		
 Georges Rivière 	
 Nélida Romero 			
 Manuel Perales 	 		
 Carlos Estrada 		
 Emilio Gaete 			
 Lalo Hartich 			
 Aurelia Ferrer 			
 Pablo Acciardi 			
 Anita Larronde	 		
 María Elena Ruas 			
 Mabel Duclos 			
 Humberto de la Rosa		
 Américo Machado 	 		
 Aníbal Pastor

References

External links
 

1956 films
1950s Spanish-language films
Argentine black-and-white films
Films based on works by Georges Feydeau
Films directed by Carlos Schlieper
1950s Argentine films